Aucellina Point is a small headland  southeast of Cape Rosa on the south coast of South Georgia. It was named in 1982 by the UK Antarctic Place-Names Committee after a mollusk of the genus Aucellina, found in a rich fossil locality nearby.

References
 

Headlands of South Georgia